John Marshall (30 January 1929 – 26 April 2012) was a Scotland international rugby union player. In his rugby career he played as a fullback. He was also a first-class cricketer.

Rugby union career

Amateur career

Marshall played for London Scottish.

International career

He was capped for  5 times in 1954.

First-class cricket
While studying at Brasenose College, Oxford he played first-class cricket for Oxford University, making his debut against Worcestershire at Oxford in 1951. He played first-class cricket for Oxford until 1953, making sixteen appearances. Marshall scored a total of 710 runs in his sixteen matches, at an average of 26.29 and a high score of 111. This score, which was his only first-class century, came against the Free Foresters in 1953. His brother, David, also played first-class cricket.

Teaching career

A pupil at Rugby School, Marshall later became a Housemaster at the school, then Acting Head Master, then Head of the Junior Department.

References

1929 births
2012 deaths
Alumni of Brasenose College, Oxford
Cricketers from Sheffield
English cricketers
London Scottish F.C. players
Oxford University cricketers
People educated at Rugby School
People from Dore
Rugby union fullbacks
Rugby union players from Sheffield
Scotland international rugby union players
Scottish rugby union players